NGC 2903 is an isolated barred spiral galaxy in the equatorial constellation of Leo, positioned about 1.5° due south of Lambda Leonis. It was discovered by German-born astronomer William Herschel, who cataloged it on November 16, 1784. He mistook it as a double nebula, as did subsequent observers, and it wasn't until the nineteenth century that the Third Earl of Rosse resolved into a spiral form. J. L. E. Dreyer assigned it the identifiers 2903 and 2905 in his New General Catalogue; NGC 2905 now designates a luminous knot in the northeastern spiral arm.

This field galaxy is located about 30 million light-years away from the Milky Way, and is a member of the Virgo Supercluster. The morphological classification of this galaxy is SBbc, indicating a barred spiral (SB) with moderate to tightly-wound spiral arms (bc). De Vaucouleurs and associates assigned it the class SAB(rs)bc, suggesting a weaker bar structure (SAB) with a partial ring (rs). The bar structure appears stronger in the near infrared band. The galaxy as a whole is inclined by an angle of 60° to the line of sight from the Earth.

72% of the stellar mass is located in the outer disk of the galaxy, and 20% is found in the bar. The bulge adds 5% of the stellar mass, and its star population is generally older. However, the central  radius volume of the core is a strong starburst region. The star formation rate here is  y−1 and it is being fed by gas inflow along the bar. There is no evidence of an active nucleus.

References

External links 

 SEDS: Spiral Galaxy NGC 2903
 NOAO: NGC 2903
 
 
 

Barred spiral galaxies
Field galaxies
Virgo Supercluster
Leo (constellation)
2903
27077
05079
17841116